Giuseppe Dell'Anno (born 17 February 1976) is an Italian engineer and baker who won the twelfth series of The Great British Bake Off in 2021. He works as a chef, an author and an engineer.

Early life 
Dell'Anno was born in Rome (Italy) from Maria, a civil servant, and Cosmo (Mimino), a professional chef. He has one younger sister, Maria Teresa.
He spent his early life in Gaeta where he attended Liceo Scientifico 'E. Fermi', obtaining maturità scientifica with top marks in 1994 
He graduated from University of Pisa in Chemical Engineering with a thesis on polymeric nanocomposites in 2004.
He moved to England in 2002, working as a research assistant at Cranfield University, where he completed his doctoral degree in 2007 with a thesis on tufting, a composite manufacturing technology.
He worked for a series of academic and industrial employers; at the time of The Great British Bake Off, he was chief engineer at the National Composites Centre and industrial fellow at the University of Bristol.

Television career

In 2021, Dell'Anno took part in the twelfth season of The Great British Bake Off. After winning Star Baker twice and collecting two Hollywood handshakes throughout the show, he became the first Italian to win the competition.

The following year, Dell'Anno wrote a regular "Britalian Bake-Off Review" column for the Radio Times, covering each episode of the next season's Great British Bake Off.

In June 2022, Dell'Anno announced the publication of his debut cookbook, with recipes based on his father's lifetime notes.

Personal life 
Dell'Anno moved to the United Kingdom in 2002 and has lived in England ever since. He briefly relocated to Milan shortly after filming The Great British Bake Off in July 2021, but returned to the UK in February 2022. He currently lives in Bristol with his wife Laura and three sons: Giorgio, Riccardo and Alberto.

Publications 
 Giuseppe's Italian Bakes (2022)

External links

References 

The Great British Bake Off contestants
Engineers from Bristol
1976 births
Living people